During the 1996–97 season, Tottenham Hotspur participated in the FA Premier League.

Season summary
For two seasons running, Tottenham narrowly missed out on a UEFA Cup place. 1996–97 could have been the season when Gerry Francis finally got it right and secured either a top-five finish or victory in one of the cups, but early exits from the FA Cup and Coca-Cola Cup ended their chances of a Wembley final, and a 10th-place finish in the final table was the club's lowest since Francis took over in November 1994. This disappointment saw the manager's future thrown into serious doubt, with fans calling for him to be dismissed.

Final league table

Results summary

Results by matchday

Results
Tottenham Hotspur's score comes first

Legend

FA Premier League

FA Cup

League Cup

Squad

Left club during season

Reserve squad

Coaching staff

Statistics

Appearances and goals

|-
! colspan=14 style=background:#dcdcdc; text-align:center| Goalkeepers

|-
! colspan=14 style=background:#dcdcdc; text-align:center| Defenders

|-
! colspan=14 style=background:#dcdcdc; text-align:center| Midfielders

|-
! colspan=14 style=background:#dcdcdc; text-align:center| Forwards

|-

Goal scorers 

The list is sorted by shirt number when total goals are equal.

Clean sheets

References

Tottenham Hotspur F.C. seasons
Tottenham Hotspur